Abdul Ghafar al-Akhras   (1804-1873) titled al-Akhras ('mute'), was an Ottoman poet and calligrapher, born in Mosul who moved to live in Baghdad. He attended the seminar of Mahmud al-Alusi  (Mufti of Ottoman Iraq). During his life in Baghdad, al-Akhras was an enemy of "Omar bin Ramadan al-Hiti" another poet and calligrapher. They satirized each other.

Al-Akhras authored many famous jokes and proverbs. He wrote "Abdul Ghani Al Jamil's collection of poems". Al-Akhras, Mohammed Saeed Al-Habboubi, and Abdul Baqi Al-Omari are considered the best 19th century Ottoman-Iraqi poets. He was buried in Basra in 1875.

References

19th-century poets of Ottoman Iraq
Writers from Mosul
Writers from Baghdad
1804 births
1873 deaths
Male poets from the Ottoman Empire
19th-century calligraphers
19th-century male writers
Ottoman Arabic poets